William, Will, Bill, or Billy Holland may refer to:

Politicians
 William Holland (merchant), English merchant and MP for Dartmouth
 William Holland (politician) (1782–?), Irish-born farmer and politician in Nova Scotia
 William H. Holland (politician) (1841–1907), member of the Fifteenth Texas Legislature
 William Holland, 1st Baron Rotherham (1849–1927), British industrialist and politician

Sportsmen

Baseball
 Will Holland (baseball) (1862–1930), baseball player
 Billy Holland (baseball) (1874–?), pitcher, Negro league career 1894–1908
 Bill Holland (right-handed pitcher) (Elvis William Holland, 1901–1973), pitcher, Negro leagues career 1920–1941
 Bill Holland (left-handed pitcher) (William David Holland, 1915–1997), pitcher, Major League career 1939

Other sports
 Bill Holland (sprinter) (1874–1930), track and field athlete
 Bill Holland (1907–1984), American racing driver
 Bill Holland (basketball) (1914–2000), American professional basketball player
 Billy Holland (born 1985), Irish rugby union player

Others
 William Holland (diarist) (1746–1819), English diarist
 William Holland (publisher) (1757–1834), British radical, author and publisher
 William Holland (stained glass maker) (1809–1883), British maker of stained glass
 William Jacob Holland (1848–1932), zoologist and paleontologist
 William L. Holland (1907–2008), Institute of Pacific Relations
 Will Holland (born 1980), musician

See also
 Holland (surname)